Modriach is a former municipality in the district of Voitsberg in the Austrian state of Styria. Since the 2015 Styria municipal structural reform, it is part of the municipality Edelschrott.

Geography
Modriach lies southwest of Graz north of the Koralp mountain.

References

Cities and towns in Voitsberg District